Sheetal (Hindi : शीतल) is a Hindu/Sanskrit Indian name given name, which means "cool".

Notable people named Sheetal 
Sheetal Amte, Indian public health expert, disability specialist and social entrepreneur
Sheetal Mallar (born 1974), Indian model
Sheetal Menon (born 1985), Indian actress and model
Sheetal Pandey (born 1947), Indian politician, member of Bharatiya Janata Party
Sheetal Sheth (born 1976), American actress and producer
Sheetal Singh, Indian actress
Sheetal Vyas, American film producer

Hindu given names
Indian feminine given names